Love and Youth is the debut album by Jenny Wilson. Released in April, 2005, it reached #26 on the Swedish albums chart. Two singles were released from the album: 'Summer Time - The Roughest Time', and 'Let My Shoes Lead Me Forward'.

In 2011, it was placed at number three on NME's The 100 Greatest Albums You've Never Heard list.

Track listing
"Crazy Summer" – 3:18
"Summer Time - The Roughest Time" – 3:32
"Let My Shoes Lead Me Forward" – 4:27
"Those Winters" – 3:33
"Bitter? No, I Just Love to Complain" – 4:24
"Would I Play with My Band?" – 4:07
"Love and Youth" – 4:34
"A Hesitating Cloud of Despair" – 3:07
"Love Ain't Just a Four Letter Word" – 5:10
"Common Around Here" – 4:09
"Hey, What's the Matter?" – 4:58
"Balcony Smoker" – 2:32

References

2005 albums
Jenny Wilson (singer) albums